The James C. Beecher House is a historic house located at 560 5th Avenue in Owego, Tioga County, New York.

Description and history 
It is a 2-story, High Victorian Gothic style frame dwelling. It has a steep gable roof with dormers and board-and-batten siding. It was once owned by James Chaplin Beecher Who, during the Civil War era was the Colonel of the 35th United States Colored Troops.

It was listed on the National Register of Historic Places on July 27, 2012.

References

Houses on the National Register of Historic Places in New York (state)
Gothic Revival architecture in New York (state)
Houses in Tioga County, New York
National Register of Historic Places in Tioga County, New York
Houses completed in 1867